The 2011 Büschl Open was a professional tennis tournament played on carpet courts. It was the sixth edition of the tournament which was part of the 2011 ITF Women's Circuit. It took place in Ismaning, Germany between 31 October and 6 November 2011.

WTA entrants

Seeds

 1 Rankings are as of October 24, 2011.
 Krajicek withdrew, therefore Záhlavová became the ninth seed.

Other entrants
The following players received wildcards into the singles main draw:
  Annika Beck
  Dinah Pfizenmaier
  Christina Shakovets
  Nina Zander

The following players received entry from the qualifying draw:
  Daria Gavrilova
  Vanessa Henke
  Valeria Solovieva
  Carina Witthöft

The following players received entry from a Lucky loser spot:
  Kim Grajdek
  Dalila Jakupovič

Champions

Singles

 Anne Keothavong def.  Yvonne Meusburger, 6–3, 1–6, 6–2

Doubles

 Kiki Bertens /  Anne Keothavong def.  Kristina Barrois /  Yvonne Meusburger, 6–3, 6–3

External links
Official Website
ITF Search

Buschl Open
Ismaning Open
2011 in German tennis